Bagnaia may refer to:

Places
Bagnaia, Anghiari, a village in the province of Arezzo, Italy
Bagnaia, Livorno, a village in the province of Livorno, Italy
Bagnaia, Perugia, a village in the province of Perugia, Italy
Bagnaia, Murlo, a village in the province of Siena, Italy
Bagnaia, Viterbo, a village in the province of Viterbo, Italy

People
Francesco Bagnaia (born 1997), Italian motorcycle racer